Ololygon trapicheiroi is a species of frog in the family Hylidae.
It is endemic to Brazil.
Its natural habitats are subtropical or tropical moist lowland forests and rivers.
It is threatened by habitat loss.

References

trapicheiroi
Endemic fauna of Brazil
Amphibians of Brazil
Taxa named by Bertha Lutz
Amphibians described in 1954
Taxonomy articles created by Polbot